Governor-Generalship of the Steppes, or General Government of the Steppes (Степное генерал-губернаторство in Russian), was a portion of Imperial Russian Central Asia which included both much of modern Eastern and Central Kazakhstan (formerly known as the Kirghiz Steppe) and the region around Omsk, which was formerly part of western Siberia.

Omsk was the capital.

References

 

Steppes
Kazakhstan in the Russian Empire